This is a list of female Heroes of the Russian Federation; of the over 1,000 people awarded the title, 18 are women.

References

Bibliography

 
Lists of Russian women